Juan Camilo Vargas (born 18 April 1994, in Bogota) is a Colombian professional squash player. As of February 2018, he was ranked number 102 in the world.

References

1994 births
Living people
Colombian male squash players
Trinity Bantams men's squash players
South American Games silver medalists for Colombia
South American Games bronze medalists for Colombia
South American Games medalists in squash
Competitors at the 2018 South American Games
Squash players at the 2019 Pan American Games
Pan American Games medalists in squash
Pan American Games silver medalists for Colombia
Squash players at the 2015 Pan American Games
Medalists at the 2019 Pan American Games
Medalists at the 2015 Pan American Games
Sportspeople from Bogotá
21st-century Colombian people